Airport Business Park is a real estate development in Vilnius, Lithuania, located 300 metres from Vilnius International Airport entrance. It is the largest such development in the airport area and is used by airport-related companies.

The development has a 6 ha area and 22 000 square metres rental space. Most of the space are warehouses with the minority used for industrial purposes. A grocery store Norfa also exists and a restaurant is planned.

The development was built in several stages in 2006 to 2012.

The tenants include DHL and Avon Products.

External links / References

Official English website

Logistics companies of Lithuania
Business parks of Lithuania
2006 establishments in Lithuania
Companies based in Vilnius